The 1st Infantry Regiment, King's Close Bodyguard (ร.1 ทม.รอ.) is a King's Guard regiment under the 1st Division, King's Guard of the Royal Thai Army. The regiment is divided into three battalions, all of them based in Bangkok. The regiment is the only unit of the Royal Thai Armed Forces with the designation Mahat Lek Rajawallop; meaning the king's close bodyguards, translated as the King's Own Bodyguards. The unit was first established by King Chulalongkorn (Rama V) in 1859, whilst he was still a young prince. One of the primary role of the regiment is to provide security and protection to members of the Thai royal family as well as the ceremonial escort and guarding of the royal palaces. The unit is the oldest regiment of the Thai army.

History
The Royal Guards were established by King Chulalongkorn (Rama V) of Siam in 1859, when he was still a young prince. Initially, the Royal Guards were servants with duties such as scaring crows, which led to commoners referring to them as the "Mahat Lek Lai Ka," roughly translated as "Scarecrow Corps."

When he succeeded his father in 1868, King Chulalongkorn took his Royal Guard and formed a 24-strong Royal Bodyguard, referred to as the "Thahan Song Lo" (Two-Dozen soldiers"). In 1870, the unit was upgraded into a full army regiment and was given the name the "King's Guard" and their duties included escorting the king while he travelled around the country. The king commanded the regiment himself until 1873, when he appointed Lieutenant General Chao Phraya Phasakornwongse as its first military commander.

The Royal Guards still exist down to the present and serve as protectors of the royal family of Thailand.

On 18 January 2019, the unit has renamed to 1st King's Own Bodyguard Regiment. Then, on 23 April 2019, The unit has renamed again to 1st Infantry Regiment, King's Close Bodyguard.

On October 1, 2019, the command of the unit was transferred from the 1st Division, King's Guard to the Royal Security Command under the command of King Vajiralongkorn, along with 11th Infantry Regiment. Thereby removing the two units out of the chain of command of the Royal Thai Army and into the monarchy.

Organization

Active
  (King Vajiralongkorn's Own Guards)
 2nd Infantry Battalion, 1st King's Own Bodyguard Regiment (King  Vajiralongkorn's Own Guards)
  (King Vajiralongkorn's Own Guards)

Dissolved
 4th Infantry Battalion, 1st King's Own Bodyguard Regiment (King Chulalongkorn's Own Guards) (amalgamated with the Royal Security Command and renamed to The King's Close Bodyguard Command in 2017)

Notable members
Prince Bhanurangsi Savangwongse Commander of the regiment 1879-1885
Prince Damrong Rajanubhab Commander of the regiment 1885-1892
Crown Prince Maha Vajiravudh (later King Rama VI) Commander of the regiment 1901-1910
Prince Chakrabongse Bhuvanath Commander of the regiment 1910-1919
Paribatra Sukhumbandhu Commander of the regiment 1923-1932
Prince Mahidol Adulyadej as a special Colonel of the regiment in 1926
 Field Marshal Sarit Thanarat Commander of the regiment 1945–1948, Prime Minister of Thailand 1958-1963
 Field Marshal Praphas Charusathien Commander of the regiment 1948–1951, Commander in Chief of the Army 1964-1973 
General Kris Sivara, Commander in Chief of the Army 1973-1975
HM King Maha Vajiralongkorn as an honorary Captain of the regiment in 1965 and a battalion commander in 1980
Princess Maha Chakri Sirindhorn, the Princess Royal as an honorary Captain of the regiment in 1977

Gallery

See also

List of army units called Guards
King's Guard (Thailand)
Thai Royal Guards parade
Monarchy of Thailand
Head of the Royal Thai Armed Forces

References

External links
 Official Website of the 1st Infantry Regiment

King's Guard units of Thailand
Military units and formations established in 1859
Thailand Royal Guards
1859 establishments in Siam
Guards regiments